Don Emilio Alcalá-Galiano y Valencia, 4th Count of Casa Valencia and 2nd Viscount of the Pontón (7 March 1831, in Madrid, Spain – 12 November 1914, in San Sebastián, Spain) was a Spanish noble and politician who served as Minister of State in the reign of King Alfonso XII.

References
Geneall.net Emilio Alcalá Galiano, 4th Count of Casa Valencia

|-

Counts of Spain
Viscounts of Spain
Foreign ministers of Spain
Members of the Royal Spanish Academy
1831 births
1914 deaths
Conservative Party (Spain) politicians
Ambassadors of Spain to the United Kingdom of Great Britain and Ireland